The Khokhar Zer dam lies in the south of Chakwal subdivision in Pakistan. Its capacity is 2602 A.Ft and it irrigates 1200 acres. Water supplied to Chakwal city also comes from this dam.

References

Dams in Pakistan